Nelly Junior Joseph (born November 20, 2001) is a Nigerian college basketball player for the Iona Gaels of the Metro Atlantic Athletic Conference (MAAC).

Early life
Junior Joseph grew up in Benin City, Nigeria and was friends with future NBA player Charles Bassey. At the age of 13, a local coach noticed his height and suggested he play basketball. Junior Joseph initially declined, as he wanted to focus on soccer, but was able to dunk after two weeks of practice. He attended high school for a year in Japan. Former NBA player Olumide Oyedeji informed NBA Academy Africa director Roland Houston about Junior Joseph, and he joined the academy after impressing Houston at a tryout. Junior Joseph played at the academy for two years and occasionally competed against NBA players such as Gorgui Dieng. Junior Joseph initially committed to playing college basketball for Wichita State, but received a late offer from Iona coach Rick Pitino, and he switched his commitment to the Gaels.

College career
Due to the COVID-19 pandemic, embassies in Africa were closed, and Junior Joseph was unable to secure a visa to the United States. He was eventually able to reach Iona on October 29, 2020, shortly before the season started. Junior Joseph averaged 11.1 points and 7.5 rebounds per game as a freshman. He was named MAAC Freshman of the Week four times, and earned MAAC Freshman of the Year honors at the conclusion of the regular season. On November 13, 2021, Junior Joseph scored a career-high 28 points in a 90–87 overtime win against Harvard. He was named to the First Team All-MAAC as a sophomore.

Career statistics

College

|-
| style="text-align:left;"| 2020–21
| style="text-align:left;"| Iona
| 18 || 16 || 27.7 || .596 || .000 || .638 || 7.5 || 1.3 || .6 || 1.6 || 11.1

References

External links
Iona Gaels bio

2001 births
Living people
Iona Gaels men's basketball players
Nigerian men's basketball players
Nigerian expatriate basketball people in the United States
Power forwards (basketball)
Sportspeople from Lagos